The solidarity tax on wealth ( or ISF) was an annual direct wealth tax on those in France having assets in excess of €1,300,000 (since 2011). It was one of the Socialist Party's 1981 electoral platform's measures, 110 Propositions for France.  First named IGF (Impôt sur les Grandes Fortunes), it was abolished in 1986 by Jacques Chirac's right-wing government, but reestablished in 1988 as ISF in slightly different terms after François Mitterrand's reelection.

In September 2017, the Government of France decided to abolish ISF and replace it with the tax on real estate (IFI), from 2018.

Scope
The calculation applied to tax declarers, meaning that it could apply to a grouping of two individuals: married couples, cohabiting couples, or couples with a PACS. All global assets were taken into account for French residents; for others, the tax was based on assets that reside in France, with the exception of financial ones.

The ISF was controversial; critics claimed it drove away wealthy individuals from the country, resulting in financial loss. A report by a senator estimated that 843 people left France in 2006 because of the tax, resulting in a net loss of €2.8 billion.

Basis
In principle all assets were taken into account except for the following:

 professional goods such as enterprises (depending on the percentage owned),
 vintage (more than one century old) and collection objects,
 artistic, literature, or industrial rights,
 woods and participation in forestry plantations (for 75% of their value),
 anonymous bonds,
 capital value of pensions and retirement plans,
 capital obtained as compensation for physical injury in accidents or due to illness.

Revenue
ISF brought in €4.42 billion in 2007, 19% more than in 2006. It constitutes 1.5% of France's total tax receipts.

Half of all households who pay ISF make an annual contribution of less than €2,000.

Rules to fix the net taxable value
ISF was levied on what remained of the gross value after subtracting deductible debts. The gross value was determined by the declarer following certain rules. For example, the value of the principal home was reduced by 30%, as was done for some rental income. Certain real estate properties in countries with a fiscal convention such as Denmark, Luxembourg, Egypt, Finland, Netherlands, and Czech Republic were excluded. The furniture in the home could not exceed 5% of the total value of the other goods.

Following President Nicolas Sarkozy's tax law of 2007, ISF was adjusted so that the sum of all taxes due in France would not exceed 50% of the annual revenues. He overturned this in 2011, at the same time as lowering the rates of the ISF.

Rates

After calculation, a deduction was granted for minors or any disabled persons living in the same household.

See also
 Taxation in France

References

Taxation in France
1981 establishments in France
Taxation and redistribution